Abludomelita is a genus of amphipod crustacean.

Species

The genus contains the following species:

 Abludomelita aculeata (Chevreux, 1911)
 Abludomelita amoena (Hansen, 1888)
 Abludomelita breviarticulata  (Ren, 2012)
 Abludomelita denticulata (Nagata, 1965)
 Abludomelita gladiosa (Bate, 1862)
 Abludomelita huanghaiensis  (Ren, 2012)
 Abludomelita japonica (Nagata, 1965)
 Abludomelita klitinii  Labay, 2016
 Abludomelita machaera  (K.H. Barnard, 1955)
 Abludomelita mucronata (Griffiths, 1975)
 Abludomelita obtusata (Montagu, 1813)
 Abludomelita okhotensis  Labay, 2016
 Abludomelita richardi (Chevreux, 1900)]
 Abludomelita rotundactyla  (Ren, 2012)
 Abludomelita sexstachya (Gamo, 1977)
 Abludomelita somovae (Bulycheva, 1952)
 Abludomelita unamoena (Hirayama, 1987)

The genus previous contained two species that have been transferred to other genera as Alsacomelita semipalmata and Meltita tuberculata.

References

Gammaridea
Crustaceans of the Atlantic Ocean